Charlotte Corday assassinated Jean-Paul Marat in the French Revolution.

Charlotte Corday may also refer to:

Charlotte Corday (opera), a 1989 Italian opera
Charlotte Corday (1908 film), a 1908 French film
Charlotte Corday (1919 film), a 1919 German silent film